East Cambridgeshire District Council is a non-metropolitan district council in the county of Cambridgeshire in the United Kingdom. It was formed under the Local Government Act 1972 from the former Ely Urban District, Ely Rural District and Newmarket Rural District councils.

East Cambridgeshire operates the "alternative arrangements" form of political management, with cross-party representation in a series of Committees. Councillors are elected for four-year terms. The last election was in 2015.

The City of Ely Council is a parish council, comprising, aside Ely, the villages of Prickwillow, Stuntney, Queen Adelaide, Chettisham and Shippea Hill. The Mayor of the City of Ely is Chairman of City of Ely Council.

Political control
Since 2007, the council has been under Conservative control. Since the foundation of the council in 1973 political control of the council has been held by the following parties:

Leadership
The leaders of the council since 2011 have been:

Council elections

Notes:

By-election results

2003-2007

2011-2015

2015-2019

2019-2023

References

External links
East Cambridgeshire District Council

 
Council elections in Cambridgeshire
East Cambridgeshire District
District council elections in England